Scott Thomas Shaunessy (born January 22, 1964) is an American retired professional ice hockey player who played seven games in the National Hockey League with the Quebec Nordiques during 1986–87 and 1988–89 seasons. The rest of his career, which lasted from 1987 to 1999, was spent in the minor leagues. He has two daughters who also both play hockey, Caroline Shaunessy who played for IFK Helsinki and graduated from and played at Dartmouth College and Julia Shaunessy who plays at his alma mater Boston University.

Career statistics

Regular season and playoffs

Awards and honors

References

External links

1964 births
Living people
Albany Choppers players
American men's ice hockey defensemen
Austin Ice Bats players
Boston University Terriers men's ice hockey players
Cincinnati Cyclones (IHL) players
Fort Wayne Komets players
Fort Worth Brahmas players
Fredericton Express players
Halifax Citadels players
Ice hockey players from Rhode Island
Ice hockey players from Massachusetts
Muskegon Lumberjacks players
People from Reading, Massachusetts
Quebec Nordiques draft picks
Quebec Nordiques players
Sportspeople from Middlesex County, Massachusetts
Sportspeople from Newport, Rhode Island
Tupelo T-Rex players